The Hotlines were an English pop punk band, who formed in Brighton in 2007. They released a split 7-inch record with American pop punk band the Queers in 2008, followed by a self-titled debut album in 2009. Both releases were on Devil's Jukebox records. Their follow-up record, The Return Of... The Hotlines was released on 10-inch vinyl on Monster Zero Records in 2011. During this time they have toured all over Europe. Their sound has often been compared to early Green Day, with nods to the Beach Boys and the Ramones.

Discography

Studio albums
The Hotlines (2009) Devil's Jukebox Records
Can't Stop Partying (2012) Devil's Jukebox Records

EPs
self titled (CDEP) 2007, Bubblegum Attack Records
untitled (split 7-inch with Radio Days) 2007, Nothing To Prove Records
untitled (split 7-inch with The Queers) 2008, Devil's Jukebox Records
The Return Of... The Hotlines (2011) Monster Zero Records

Compilations
When The Kids Go Go Go Crazy - A Tribute To The Groovie Ghoulies, 2008, Kamikaze Records
Where The Fun Never Sets Volume 2, 2008, Cabana 1 Records

References

External links
The Hotlines Official Website

English pop punk groups
English punk rock groups